Juliusz Janusz (born 17 March 1944) is a Polish prelate of the Catholic Church who has spent his career in the diplomatic service of the Holy See. He has been an archbishop and held the position of Apostolic Nuncio from 1995 until he retired in 2018.

Biography
Juliusz Janusz was born on 17 March 1944 in Łyczana, Poland.

He was ordained a priest on 19 March 1967 by Karol Wojtyła, Archbishop of Krakow, later Pope John Paul II.

He went to Rome with the intention of earning a degree in canon law but at Wojtyła's urging entered the Pontifical Ecclesiastical Academy to prepare for a career as a diplomat. Pope Paul VI gave him his first assignment in the diplomatic service of the Holy See in the Nunciature to Thailand, and he then filled positions in Denmark, Sweden, Finland, Norway, Iceland and Greenland, West and East Germany, Brazil, the Netherlands, Hungary and Taiwan, where he was chargé d’affaires for three years.

On 25 March 1995, Pope John Paul II appointed him titular archbishop of Caprulae and Apostolic Nuncio to Rwanda. He received his episcopal consecration from Cardinal Angelo Sodano on 8 May. John Paul named him Apostolic Nuncio to Mozambique on 26 September 1998 and then to Hungary on 9 April 2003.

On 10 February 2011, Pope Benedict XVI appointed him Apostolic Nuncio to Slovenia and Apostolic Delegate to Kosovo. Because the independent status of Kosovo was still a matter of dispute, his appointment—the first time the Holy See had assigned a diplomat there—was accompanied by an explanatory note: "The mission of an Apostolic Delegate is not of a diplomatic nature but responds to the requirement to meet in an adequate way the pastoral needs of the Catholic faithful."

He retired on 21 September 2018.

See also
 List of heads of the diplomatic missions of the Holy See

References

External links

Catholic Hierarchy: Archbishop Juliusz Janusz 

Living people
1944 births
Pontifical Ecclesiastical Academy alumni
Apostolic Nuncios to Rwanda
Apostolic Nuncios to Mozambique
Apostolic Nuncios to Slovenia
Apostolic Nuncios to Kosovo
Apostolic Nuncios to Hungary
Polish Roman Catholic priests
People from Nowy Sącz County